Lasius speculiventris is a species of ant that is commonly found in the northern United States and lives in forests, woodlands, and meadows.

References

External links

speculiventris
Insects described in 1983
Hymenoptera of North America